Britannia School may refer to:

Britannia Secondary School
Britannia High School